Hazardous and Unhealthy is a 2003 Greek drama film directed by Antonis Papadoupoulos. It was entered into the 26th Moscow International Film Festival.

Plot
An old guerrilla of the Greek Resistance arrives at a small village, where he had done a heroic act during occupation of Greece, thirty years ago. There, he discovers that the villagers considered him as dead and honoured him as hero. His arrival upsets the residents, because many lies could be disclosed.

Cast
 Paschalis Tsarouhas
 Nena Menti
 Antonis Antoniou
 Regina Pantelidi
 Nikos Zoiopoulos
 Yannis Zouganelis

References

External links
 

2003 films
2003 drama films
Greek drama films
2000s Greek-language films